Jesús Ignacio Ibáñez Loyo (born 18 March 1960 in Ametzaga, Zuia) is a retired Spanish cyclist.

Major results
1983
3rd Vuelta a Castilla
1st stage 4
1984
 National Road Race Champion
1st stage 6 Vuelta a Asturias
2nd Memorial Manuel Galera
3rd Vuelta a Asturias
1987
1st stage 6 Vuelta a España

References

1960 births
Living people
Spanish male cyclists
Sportspeople from Álava
Cyclists from the Basque Country (autonomous community)